The Croonian Medal and Lecture is a prestigious award, a medal, and lecture given at the invitation of the Royal Society and the Royal College of Physicians.

Among the papers of William Croone at his death in 1684, was a plan to endow a single lectureship at both the Royal Society and the Royal College of Physicians. His wife provided the bequest in 1701 specifying that it was "for the support of a lecture and illustrative experiment for the advancement of natural knowledge on locomotion, or (conditionally) of such other subjects as, in the opinion of the President for the time being, should be most useful in promoting the objects for which the Royal Society was instituted". One lecture was to be delivered by a Fellow of the Royal College of Physicians and the other, on the nature and laws of muscular motion, to be delivered before the Royal Society. The Royal Society lecture series began in 1738 and that of the Royal College of Physicians in 1749.

Croone became an original Fellow of the Royal Society in May 1663. He also became a Fellow of the College of Physicians on 29 July 1675. He was appointed lecturer on anatomy at Surgeons' hall in 1670 and pursued research in several important subjects of his day, including respiration, muscular motion, and generation.

One individual, Sir Stephen O’Rahilly FRS, FRCP has received the award twice: initially from the Royal College of Physicians in 2011, and then from the Royal Society in 2022 (below).

List of lecturers (Royal Society – for RCP lecturers see below)
Source: Royal Society

21st century

20th century

19th century 
Source (1801–30):

18th century 
Source:

List of Lecturers (Royal College of Physicians)

21st century
2018 Rebecca Fitzgerald, Precision early diagnosis of oesophageal cancer using a pill on a string 
2017 Jonathan Ashmore, for his research into hearing; his analysis of cochlear hair cells has revolutionised our understanding of how the ear works.
2016 Pamela Shaw, Translational neuroscience approach to developing new effective treatments for Motor Neurone Disease 
2015
2014
2013 Peter Openshaw, Disease mechanisms revealed by studies of pandemic influenza 
2012 Marc Feldmann, Development of anti cytokine therapy and its future potential 
2011 Stephen O'Rahilly, Obesity and its metabolic consequences: lessons from the extremes 
2010 Sir Gordon Duff, Challenges in the development of innovative medicines 
2009 Peter John Barnes, Reversing steroid resistance in inflammatory diseases: a novel therapeutic strategy
2008 Martin Neil Rossor, Dementia – global or modular?
2007 Peter J. Goadsby,  Bench to bedside: headache 2007
2006 Peter John Ratcliffe, Understanding hypoxia signalling in cells; a new therapeutic opportunity?
2005 David A. Lomas, Molecular mousetraps, a -antitrypsin deficiency and the serpinopathies
2004 Alastair Compston, The marvellous harmony of the nervous parts':The origins of multiple sclerosis
2003 David Barker, Coronary heart disease and type 2 diabetes: disorders of growth
2002 Humphrey Hodgson, Liver cells – biology to therapeutics 
2001 Elwyn Elias, Hepato-canalicular cholestasis – its mechanisms, causes and consequences 
2000 John Connell, Regulation of the corticosteroid phenotype in humans – implications in the pathogenesis of asthma

20th century

19th century

18th century

References

Medical lecture series
Royal College of Physicians
Royal Society lecture series